Scombriformes is an order of bony fish containing nine families which were classified under the suborders Scombroidei and Stromateoidei, of the wider grouping known as Perciformes, Fishes of the World, 5th ed. (2016), recognised the order but subsequent workers have suggested that Scombriformes forms part of the larger Pelagiaria clade.

Families
The families placed under Scombriformes in Nelson 2016 are:

 Order Scombriformes
 Suborder Scombroidei
 Family Gempylidae (snake mackerels)
 Family Trichiuridae (cutlassfishes)
 Subfamily Aphanopodinae
 Subfamily Lepidopodinae
 Subfamily Trichiurinae
 Family Scombridae (mackerels and tunas)
 Subfamily Gasterochismatinae
 Subfamily Scombrinae
 Suborder Stromateoidei
 Family Amarsipidae (the amarsipa)
 Family Centrolophidae (medusafishes)
 Family Nomeidae (driftfishes)
 Family Ariommatidae (ariommatids)
 Family Tetragonuridae (squaretails)
 Family Stromateidae (butterfishes)

In Betancur-R et al., 2017, the following additional families are placed under Scombriformes, which is considered synonymous with the Pelagiaria clade.
 Family Arripidae (Australasian salmon (kahawai))
 Family Bramidae (pomfrets)
 Family Caristiidae (manefishes)
 Family Chiasmodontidae (swallowers)
 Family Icosteidae (the ragfish)
 Family Pomatomidae (the bluefish)
 Family Scombrolabracidae (the longfin escolar)
 Family Scombropidae (gnomefishes)

References

 
Percomorpha